Nebria transsylvanica is a species of black coloured ground beetle in the Nebriinae subfamily that can be found in Romania and Carpathia region of Ukraine.

Description and further distribution

References

transsylvanica
Beetles described in 1824
Beetles of Europe